The New York Boulders are an American independent professional baseball team playing in the Frontier League based in Pomona, Rockland County, New York. The team was founded as a member of the Can-Am League, beginning play in the 2011 season as the Rockland Boulders. The Boulders and the rest of the teams in the Can-Am League (except for the Ottawa Champions, who were not invited) were absorbed into the Frontier League when the two leagues merged following the 2019 season.

The "Boulders" name refers to Rockland County's plethora of boulders in its landscape. The team's primary color, blue, alludes to the former Brooklyn Dodgers (now Los Angeles Dodgers), which used Bear Mountain State Park for spring training during World War II. The red honors the neighboring Rockland County Fire Training Center. Boulder Bird is the official team mascot and "Disco" Seth Cantor is the team's play-by-play announcer.

History

On May 26, 2011, the Boulders won their first official game by a score of 11-5 over the Newark Bears after coming back from a 4-1 deficit.
On July 24, 2011, in the bottom of the ninth inning with two outs, Joe Hage (23) hit a walk-off grand slam at Le Stade Municipal in Quebec City, Canada to give Rockland a 7-4 win over the Quebec Capitales. It was the first grand-slam in Boulders history.

On September 4, 2011, the Boulders announced they had signed former New York Mets player Howard Johnson to a two-game contract to play alongside his son, Glen. Both games were played against the Newark Bears.

Although the Boulders played their first 20 games away due to construction of the new stadium, they finished their inaugural season second in the league with an attendance of 123,518 tickets sold.

The New York Boulders signed their first three players Tommy Giles, Eric Flynn and Ryan Mollica, from Suffern in its history in March 2011. Of these three, Mollica remained and played in 86 games. On August 22, 2013, Boulder's pitcher Charlie Law pitched a complete game no-hitter defeating the New Jersey Jackals with the first no-hitter in franchise history.

On July 7, 2014, Outfielder Jerod Edmondson singled off Ryan Bollinger of the Trois-Rivieres Aigles in the top of the fourth inning at Trois-Rivières, breaking the all-time Can-Am League record for career hits. His 700 career hits breaks the record previously held by former Major League Toronto Blue Jays player Chris Colabello. On August 25, 2014, the Boulders beat the Trois-Riveres Aigles and clinched the playoffs for the first time in the franchise's history.

On September 2, 2014, The best-of-7 Parkway Series between the Rockland Boulders (Palisades Interstate Parkway) and the New Jersey Jackals (Garden State Parkway) began. The Boulders captured their first league championship beating New Jersey 4 games to 2.

Clover Stadium

The New York Boulders' stadium is Clover Stadium. It was originally known as Provident Bank Park then as Palisades Credit Union Park and contains 6,362 seats, 16 luxury and 11 loge boxes. The dimensions of the playing field are 323 feet down the left-field line, 313 feet down the right-field line, power alleys of 383 feet, and 403 feet at centerfield. The park also includes a 34-foot x 52-foot scoreboard, as well as a 75-foot ribbon sign board. Other features include special hearing-impaired seating with loudspeakers installed under each seat, a children's playground, and community rooms. The park also contains an indoor batting cage used by players to warm up prior to games which is open to the public during the game.

On September 4, 2011, the Rockland Boulders played to the largest crowd in its inaugural season – 6,300 fans – to see former New York Met Howard Johnson become one of the few players to have the opportunity to play in a professional game with their son. In 2012, the Boulders led the league in attendance with 161,375 fans.

Season-by-season records

Broadcasting
For the 2022 season, Boulders games are broadcast on WRCR 1700 AM and FloBaseball. Select home games are also available on Eleven Sports.

Current roster

Notable alumni

 Howard Johnson (2011) 2x MLB All-Star and 2x World Series champion
 Barry Wesson (2011)
 Gustavo Chacín (2012)
 Julio Santana (2012)
 Carlos Rivera (2013)
 Bobby Jones (2013)
 Andrew Taylor (2014)
 Stephen Cardullo (2013–2015)
 Donnie Joseph (2016)
 Markus Solbach (2016–2017)
 Mayckol Guaipe (2017)
 C. J. Riefenhauser (2017)
 Justin Topa (2017–2018)
 Ezequiel Carrera (2019)
 Zach Penprase (2021)

References

External links

 Rockland Boulders

Rockland County, New York
Professional baseball teams in New York (state)
Baseball teams established in 2011
Canadian American Association of Professional Baseball teams
Baseball teams in the New York metropolitan area
2011 establishments in New York (state)